James Heywood (28 May 1810 – 17 October 1897) was a British MP, philanthropist and social reformer.

Early life
James Heywood was born on 28 May 1810 in Manchester, Lancashire. He was the son of banker Nathaniel and Ann (née Percival) Heywood, and was the brother of Benjamin Heywood and Thomas Heywood and grandson of Thomas Percival. He matriculated from Trinity College, Cambridge and was admitted to the Inner Temple.

Career
Heywood was a member of the Portico Library and the Manchester Statistical Society, of which he was president between 1853–55, and published a study of the population of Miles Platting in Manchester. He was elected a Fellow of the Royal Statistical Society and served as their President from 1875 to 1877. He was also interested in geology and in 1840 donated some hundred specimens to help form the mineral collection of Manchester Museum. In 1835, he became the first president of the Manchester Athenaeum and he was also involved with the Manchester Literary and Philosophical Society.

Heywood was elected a Fellow of the Royal Society in February 1839. His candidature citation read: "James Heywood, Esq of Trinity College, Cambridge, residing at 17 Cork Street, London, Barrister of the Inner Temple, author of a Report on the Geology of the Coal District of South Lancashire, published in the Transactions of the British Association, & also of a Report on the state of the population in Miles Platting, Manchester, published in the Journal of the Statistical Society of London; a gentleman much attached to science, being desirous of becoming a Fellow of the Royal Society, we the undersigned, do, from our personal knowledge, recommend him as deserving of that honor, & as likely to be a useful & valuable member"

Heywood was Liberal MP for North Lancashire from 1847 to 1857. He campaigned for free libraries, museums and art galleries, university entrance for dissenters and university degrees for women. He was President of the Sunday Society which campaigned for leisure activities to be available on Sundays.

Heywood opened the first free library in Kensington at Notting Hill Gate in the 1870s, a decade prior to the 1889 dedication of the Kensington Central Library in the Kensington Vestry Hall.

Personal life and death
Heywood married on 11 June 1853 Anne (née Kennedy) Escher, the daughter of John Kennedy and widow of Albert Escher; they had a daughter Anne Sophia. They lived in London.

Heywood died on 17 October 1897.

References

External links 

 
 

1810 births
1897 deaths
Politicians from Manchester
Fellows of the Royal Society
Presidents of the Royal Statistical Society
Liberal Party (UK) MPs for English constituencies
British social reformers
UK MPs 1847–1852
UK MPs 1852–1857
Alumni of Trinity College, Cambridge
Burials at Barnes Cemetery
James